Mount Sindoro, Mount Sindara or Mount Sundoro is an active stratovolcano in Central Java, Indonesia. Parasitic craters and cones are found in the northwest-southern flanks; the largest is called Kembang. A small lava dome occupies the volcano's summit. Historical eruptions have been mostly mild to moderate.

See also 

 List of volcanoes in Indonesia

References 

Stratovolcanoes of Indonesia
Mountains of Central Java
Volcanoes of Central Java
Active volcanoes of Indonesia
Holocene stratovolcanoes